Aleksey Vladimirovich Zhuk (born November 6, 1955) is a former Soviet/Russian handball player who competed in the 1980 Summer Olympics.

In 1980 he won the silver medal with the Soviet team. He played all six matches and scored twenty goals.

He was a handball player for CSKA Moscow between 1974 and 1987, and since 1987 he served in the administrative side of CSKA. He is the head trainer and chief of CSKA tennis team since 1994. He is also an adviser to the general director of Alexander Ostrovsky Academy in sports issues.

External links
Profile at Sports Reference
The coaching staff of AOA

1955 births
Living people
Soviet male handball players
Russian male handball players
Handball players at the 1980 Summer Olympics
Olympic handball players of the Soviet Union
Olympic silver medalists for the Soviet Union
Olympic medalists in handball
Honoured Coaches of Russia
Medalists at the 1980 Summer Olympics